Oswego East High School, or OEHS, is a public four-year high school located in Oswego, Illinois, a southwest suburb of Chicago, Illinois, in the United States. It is part of Oswego Community Unit School District 308, which also includes Oswego High School. The high school was established in 2004 due to the growing population in Oswego, Illinois. From 2012 to 2013, Oswego East underwent expansions and renovations to prepare for an additional growth in student population. The additions were completed in August 2013, increasing the previous capacity of 2,400 students to 3,200 students. Oswego East had beaten its crosstown rival Oswego for the last 18 years in the crosstown battle.

Athletics
Oswego East High School is a part of the Southwest Prairie Conference and the Illinois High School Association.

OEHS has a rivalry with Oswego High School. The matchup between the two schools is known as the "Crosstown Classic".

Notable Athletes

Robert “Tre” Jones III - Navy QB,
Oshobi Odior- Western Illinois RB,
Jared Badie- Illinois LB,
Keion Battle- Illinois WR,
Ivory Kelly Martin- Iowa RB, Noah Schultz- first round pick in the 2022 MLB Draft, Ashton Izzi- fourth round pick in the 2022 MLB Draft

Boys' teams
The school has boys' teams for a range of sports, including Baseball, Basketball, Bowling, Football, Cross Country, Golf, Soccer, Swimming, Tennis, Track, Volleyball, and Wrestling.

Girls' teams
There is also a range of girls' sports teams including Badminton, Basketball, Bowling, Cheerleading, Cross Country, Gymnastics, Soccer, Softball, Swimming, Tennis, Track, and Volleyball.

Extracurricular activities
Extracurricular activities include Academic Decathlon, Auto Club, Drama/Theater, Interact Club, Mathletes, Pom Squad, Robotics team, Scholastic Bowl, Chess Team, Speech Team, Wolfpack News, and Wolfpack Sports Fanclub.

References

External links
 Official website

Public high schools in Illinois
Educational institutions established in 2004
Schools in Kendall County, Illinois
Oswego, Illinois
2004 establishments in Illinois